Bhushan Tiwari or Chandrabhushan Tiwari (12 February 1935 - 3 October 1994) was an Indian character actor in Hindi films, who largely played negative roles in many Bollywood movies. e.g. of a villain's henchman in films, like Zanjeer (1973) and Parvarish (1977). His father was Ramayan Tiwari who also played mainly villains. He also played the role of Manilal in the TV mini-series, The Far Pavilions (1984)

Filmography

Television

References

 Bhushan Tiwari 8mm
 Bhushan Tiwari, Filmography Bollywood Hungama
 www.cuppax.in%2Fartist%2FBhushan-Tiwari%2F41371%2F&name=Bhushan+Tiwari&cat=filter&showads=1
 [www.apunkachoice.com%2Fnames%2Fbhu%2Fbhushan_tiwari%2Fcid_3745%2Ffilmography%2F&name=Bhushan+Tiwari&cat=filter&showads=1 Filmography] apunkachoice
 http://www.imindb.com/movie/Gangaa-Jamunaa-Saraswathi

External links
 

Indian male film actors
Male actors in Hindi cinema
1935 births
1994 deaths